Jenbach railway station serves the municipality of Jenbach, in the Schwaz district of the Austrian federal state of Tyrol.  It is the only station in Austria at which railway lines of three different gauges meet.

The most important line leading to Jenbach station is the Austrian Federal Railways (ÖBB) standard gauge Lower Inn Valley railway, which passes through the station. Jenbach also has two terminating narrow gauge lines - the metre gauge Achensee Railway, and the  gauge Zillertalbahn.

Connections
The Lower Inn Valley Railway connects Jenbach with the main Austrian railway network.  It therefore provides fast east-west links from (Budapest–) Vienna, and Salzburg to Innsbruck, Feldkirch and Bregenz or Zürich and Basel, and north-south links from (Berlin-) Munich to Innsbruck, Verona, Milan/Rome/Venice. Additionally there are links from Graz to Innsbruck and Bregenz.

The Zillertal is connected at Jenbach, via the Zillertalbahn, with the ÖBB main line. On the Zillertalbahn, there are not only regional trains but also regular steam-hauled special trains, which represent a great attraction, especially for tourists.

The Achensee Railway is a pure tourist railway and has no significance for commuter traffic. In Seespitz, passengers can transfer directly to one of the Achensee ships.

Train services
The station is served by the following service(s):

RailJet services Bregenz - Innsbruck - Salzburg - Linz - St Pölten - Vienna

Gallery

See also

Austrian Federal Railways
Achensee Railway
Zillertalbahn

References

External links 

 Austrian Federal Railways - official site 
 Achensee Railway - official site 
 Zillertalbahn - official site

This article is based upon a translation of the German language version as at August 2010. The original authors can be seen here.

Railway stations in Tyrol (state)
Railway stations opened in 1858